The Bavarian Class B V steam locomotives were operated by the Bavarian Eastern Railway (Bayerische Ostbahn) in Germany.

They had an external frame with outer valve gear and a Belpaire boiler.

They were equipped with  2 T 8 tenders.

See also 
Royal Bavarian State Railways
List of Bavarian locomotives and railbuses

0-4-0 locomotives
B 05 Ostbahn
Standard gauge locomotives of Germany
Railway locomotives introduced in 1869